Back to the Roots may refer to:

 Back to the Roots (John Mayall album), 1971
 Back to the Roots (Ramsey Lewis album), 1971
 An Organic farming brand in the United States

References